Panjang may refer to:

 Lang Island a.k.a. Panjang Island, in the Sunda Strait between Java and Sumatra
 Panjang Island in the South Natuna Islands off western Borneo
 Panjang Island in the middle group of the Natuna Islands off western Borneo
 Panjang Island at the mouth of the Kapuas River in West Kalimantan, Borneo
 Panjang Island off the coast of Sumbawa
 Panjang Island, Maluku, an island in the Gorom group southeast of Seram
 Common name for Acacia lasiocarpa, a plant found in Western Australia